Valenciana may refer to:

 Valencian Community (Spanish: Comunidad Valenciana), an autonomous community of Spain
 Doña Blanca, a white Spanish and Portuguese wine grape variety also known as Valenciana